This is a list of churches, chapels and meeting halls in the Channel Islands

First millennium

Although there are indications that missionary efforts created small places of Christian worship in various places in the islands before 450 A.D. the first proper evidence of Christianity is recorded as coming to the Islands around 520 A.D. when Samson of Dol visited Guernsey and in 
540 A.D. when Helier arrived in Jersey, living as a hermit until he was killed by pirates.

The "pirates" grew in strength. In 911 A.D., a group of "pirates", or Vikings led by Rollo besieged Paris and Chartres. After a victory near Chartres on 26 August, Charles the Simple decided to negotiate with Rollo, resulting in the Treaty of Saint-Clair-sur-Epte. For the Vikings' loyalty, they were granted all the land between the river Epte and the sea, as well as Brittany, which at the time was an independent country which France had unsuccessfully tried to conquer. Rollo also agreed to be baptised and to marry Charles' daughter, Gisela. The land would become known as "Normandy", the land of the North Men and included "Les Îles d'la Manche" or the Channel Islands. Religion was strengthened with the arrival and conversion of the Normans to Christianity, in the 10th century.

Second millennium

There were many churches built by the Normans in the 11th and 12th centuries, many on top of previous chapels which were themselves alongside pagan places of worship, the islands being divided up into parishes in the 11th century and land areas granted by endowment to French-based religious centres, Mont Saint Michel Abbey received four and Marmoutier Abbey, Tours six from Guernsey, Cerisy-la-Forêt acquired two in Jersey, but most other Jersey parishes were scattered amongst other people and institutions.

The Islands embraced the French Calvinist form of Protestantism during the Reformation Roman Catholicism continued until orders were received to remove all signs of Catholicism in 1547. A brief return to Catholicism saw the three women turned into martyrs before another turn, back to the Protestant faith and a fear of France and Catholics. Methodism took a stronghold at the end of the 18th century.

The Little Chapel in Guernsey has been said that it "is the smallest functioning chapel in Europe, if not the world", and it is "believed to be the world’s smallest consecrated church."

At least three churches in Guernsey have pre-history carved stones, the most famous being La Gran'mère du Chimquière. In Jersey, at La Hougue Bie a 12th-century chapel was built on a Neolithic ritual site which was in use around 3500 BC. In Western Europe, it is one of the largest and best preserved passage graves. Several churches, including Castel Church, Guernsey, have been built using materials dating back to the Roman Empire. St Saviour Church in Guernsey has a number of tunnels running underneath, built by the Organisation Todt for Nazi Germany in the 1940s.

The historic toleration of religious minorities has led to many persecuted minorities seeking refuge in the Islands, such as Huguenots from 1548. The influx of the Protestant refugees led to Calvinism becoming the main religion, forcing a break from the Roman Catholic Diocese of Coutances in 1568 to the Bishop of Winchester. Religion became strictly enforced with physical punishments (whippings, stocks, imprisonment) and torture to get confessions for Channel Islands Witch Trials for 100 years, ending only with the Act of Uniformity 1662 of Charles II of England. In the English Civil War Guernsey, with stronger puritanical sympathies supported Parliament whereas Jersey was happy to restore episcopalian constitutions, siding with the Royalists.

A famous refugee Guernsey in 1855 was Victor Hugo who increasingly expressed anti-Catholic and anti-clerical views. Hugo counted 740 attacks on a book he wrote whilst in Guernsey, Les Misérables in the Catholic press. The last major act of non-toleration goes back to 1556, with the Guernsey Martyrs who died for their Protestant faith. The Island's toleration has left a rich legacy of churches, chapels and places of worship.

The maintenance of parish churches was, before the Reformation, the responsibility of the Catholic Church. To avoid the English Crown taking over responsibility as successor, Charles II in 1677 instructed the Guernsey churchwardens to raise monies from the parishioners.

In 1893 a religious census was undertaken in Guernsey showing around 50% of the population attended:

 Anglican – 17 places – 5,998 attendants
 French Wesleyan – 17 places – 2,989 attendants
 Salvation Army – 4 places – 1,941 attendants
 English Wesleyan – 6 places – 1,783 attendants
 English R.C. – 2 places – 1,021 attendants
 Baptist – 6 places – 663 attendants

 French R.C. – 2 places – 588 attendants
 Independent – 5 places – 533 attendants
 Brethren – 6 places – 507 attendants
 New Connexion – 1 place – 452 attendants
 Primitive Methodist – 2 places – 315 attendants
 Other – 7 places – 800 attendants

Third millennium
The 2010 breakdown of followers in the Channel Islands: 

 Christians 84%

 Agnostics 14%

 Atheists 1%

 Other religions 1%

In 2022 the Anglican churches moved from under Winchester, where they had been for 500 years, to the Diocese of Salisbury.

Religions

 Anglicanism – The Deanery of Guernsey of the Church of England comes under the Diocese of Salisbury, but until 2015 was under the Diocese of Winchester. 
 Baptists – The Baptist Christian faith has been practised in Guernsey for over 200 years.
 Church of Scotland – The Church has very few churches outside Scotland, but both Guernsey and Jersey have kirks. They were established, partly to cater for the Scottish soldiers who regularly provided garrison duties.
 Elim Pentecostal Church – For over 100 years there has been a Pentecostal Church in the Islands, with Elim expanding in the 1930s.
 Evangelicalism – Auxiliary Associations existed in Gernsey and Jersey in 1814 
 Greater World Christian Spiritualism – held its first service in Jersey in 1935.
 Islam – There are no mosques or meeting places in Guernsey, Jersey has a meeting house.
 Judaism – Jews first established a synagogue in Saint Helier in 1843.
 Jehovah's Witnesses – Two English congregations and one Portuguese group in Guernsey. Three English congregations and one Portuguese congregation in Jersey.
 Methodism – Methodism reached Jersey in 1774. The first Methodist minister in Jersey was appointed in 1783, and John Wesley preached in Guernsey in 1787 and in Jersey in August 1789. The first Wesleyan chapel was built in Guernsey in 1788 opposite the Royal Court. Channel Islands District of the Methodist Church 
 Newfrontiers – A network of evangelical charismatic churches. Represented in Guernsey.
 Portuguese Christian Mission – Established in Jersey in 2009 to cater for the Portuguese Protestant community.
 Quakers – The Religious Society of Friends believed to have been active in Jersey around 1660. Recognised in the Island in 1742. In Guernsey they formed a society in 1782.
 Roman Catholic – The Catholic parishes in the Channel Islands, along with the Isle of Wight, are part of the English Diocese of Portsmouth.
 Salvation Army – Founded in Jersey in 1879 and in Guernsey in 1881 and in Alderney in 1882. The Army's founders, Catherine and William Booth, had visited Guernsey in 1855 shortly after their marriage and preached. Marie Ozanne died for her beliefs in Guernsey in 1943.
 United Reformed Church was formed in 1972 when the Presbyterian Church of England and the Congregational Church of England came together. Presbyterian churches have served the Islands for over 100 years.
 Zion Christian Fellowship – Founded in Guernsey in 1988.

List of buildings
This list is incomplete. Please feel free to expand it.

See also

 Religion in Jersey
 History of the Jews in Jersey
 History of the Jews in Guernsey
 Channel Islands

References

Religion in Guernsey
Religious buildings and structures in Guernsey
Religion in Jersey
C